Reeth Mazumder is an Indian actress, and prior to that a professional model. Reeth is also known by the moniker "Festival Girl", as a result of her films screened at various international film festivals, including Cannes.

Early life and background
Mazumder was born in Kolkata in a creatively inclined Bengali family. Her grandfather, Nikunja Bhattacharya is a veteran editor in Bengali cinema. After her graduation in English Honours with the additional subjects of script writing, radio writing and marketing, Reeth shifted to Mumbai so that she could pursue a career in acting. She has been training in various classical Indian dance forms, including Bharatanatyam since the age of four, and has performed on stage in front of a live audience on various occasions.

Career

Mazumder became the face for several leading brands including Lakmé Cosmetics, Panasonic, Listerine, Fiama Di Wills and Archies (company). In the same year she bagged the lead role in an Indo-Italian film, Visible Bra Straps after auditioning. Upon completion this film was showcased in 25 international film festivals and won critical acclaim and awards including the Audience choice award, Golden Palm, and Best Experimental film. Reeth later acknowledged that this film changed her life overnight and got her some of the best roles on the international arena. Subsequently, she signed up for her next, a French film titled The Au Revoir. This film was in the romance-drama genre, and again a major draw in European festivals. As a mark of appreciation of her work, Mazumder was chosen to showcase Asian talent at the 2011 Cannes film festival, in a new feature called "The Talent's Corner".

Her next English film, Swen in 2013, also made headlines in the festival circuit. Her next project Porobashinee  was a France-Bangladesh collaboration, and was the first science fiction and also the most expensive Bengali language film. This film was shot simultaneously in French and is awaiting mainstream release. In 2016 Reeth made her screen debut in her home country with A Scandall. Indian censor board demanded various cuts to the movie before consenting to the film's release in India. This film suffered a further setback when an Indian multiplex conglomerate backed out from screening it at the last moment, however word-of-mouth publicity and its strong business in single screen theaters helped its cause and it was back in multiplexes from its second week onwards. Because of its bold theme, A Scandall was a controversial film in a mostly conservative and traditional India, but Reeth later said that her preferring it over the usual Bollywood tree side romance as her debut, was a conscious decision as she being confident of her acting prowess is not scared of being stereotyped.

Personal life and controversies 
Mazumder is an avid traveler and often motorbikes across Europe for leisure.

In May 2016, an audiovisual clip of Reeth getting intimate with her co-actor Johnny Baweja started circulating on the internet in the form of an MMS. In the recent past, many Indian celebrities including Shahid Kapoor, Kareena Kapoor, and Radhika Apte, had been subjected to such violations of their privacy. Authorities later declared that the MMS was actually a clip from a rehearsal for her film, and that the director and the cinematographer were present at the time of its filming.

Earlier in 2016, Mazumder was embroiled in a controversy when in a video interview with a web portal she admitted buying a love doll from Paris and gifting it to her then boyfriend. She later clarified that it was a prank, however protests against her went on for a long time. 

Reeth now lives in Canada and had been writing and directing Canadian content. On 14 February 2021, she married a French Canadian filmmaker and Podcaster, Austin Roberts.

Filmography

References

External links
 
 

Indian film actresses
21st-century Indian actresses
Living people
Actresses in Hindi cinema
People from West Bengal
Indian stage actresses
1991 births